Lipovo is a rural locality (a village) in Permasskoye Rural Settlement, Nikolsky District, Vologda Oblast, Russia. The population was 40 as of 2002.

Geography 
Lipovo is located 25 km south of Nikolsk (the district's administrative centre) by road. Storozhevaya is the nearest rural locality.

References 

Rural localities in Nikolsky District, Vologda Oblast